Voskresenskoye is a rural locality (a selo) and the administrative centre of Voskresensky Selsoviet, Meleuzovsky District, Bashkortostan, Russia. The population was 1,817 as of 2010. There are 34 streets.

Geography 
Voskresenskoye is located 25 km northeast of Meleuz (the district's administrative centre) by road. Kochkar is the nearest rural locality.

References 

Rural localities in Meleuzovsky District